Star of Love is the debut studio album by English-Spanish electronic music band Crystal Fighters. It was originally released on 4 October 2010 on their label, Zirkulo. The album combines genres from Basque folk to straight electronic and dubstep.
Two special releases followed in 2011: an Australian limited edition, which included a bonus disc of acoustic remixes, and a worldwide deluxe edition, which included the acoustic tracks and an additional track.

The album charted in the United Kingdom and Belgium. Its singles have received attention from musicians and producers, who have remixed the tracks; some were selected by the band for its compilation album, Star of Love Remixes, which was released on 23 September 2012.

Development
The album drew inspiration from singer Laure Stockley's grandfather's writings; its press release mentions "the unfathomable mystery of the universe, the turbulent journey towards being at peace with death, the triumph of love, and the omnipotence of the sun". The band used synthesizers and guitars, along with traditional Basque instruments: txalaparta, danbolin and txistu. Sebastian Pringle said that the album songs had been ready for a while, but that they made sure the songs "somehow linked in with one another even though there's a slew of mad genres going on." Pringle also mentions three of the members wrote most of the album at a warehouse at home. The name of the album is a backronym of SOL, the Spanish word for "sun".

Artwork
The album artwork was done by London-based painter John Stark, who did the cover for Commix's Call to Mind album in 2007. It was an oil painting done on wood panel, and is "slightly larger" than the 12-inch cover. Stark focused on the band's Basque theme, and also added "gothic overtones and technique" characteristic of his work. The painting took six weeks to complete. The lettering was done by a different artist.

Release 
Star of Love was released on 4 October 2010.

On 4 February 2011, Crystal Fighters released a "Limited Edition" version of the album in Australia. It featured a bonus CD that consisted of five acoustic tracks.

On 8 August, Crystal Fighters released the "Deluxe Edition" worldwide. The album included the tracks from the Australian limited edition, and a cover track of "Fiesta de los Maniquíes", a Spanish song by 1980s synthpop group Golpes Bajos.

On 23 September 2012, Crystal Fighters released their Star of Love Remixes album, which contains 15 remixes of 7 tracks on their original album. They asked their favourite producers and artists to contribute.

Critical reception

The album scored a 6/10 on Any Decent Music's reviews aggregator, with 12 independent reviewers. Caitlin Welsh of The Brag called the album "exhaustingly dull" and "trying too hard to fit into every possible current genre". Alex Hoban of NME was equally critical: "With Delorean doing the same thing right now so much better, favouring Crystal Fighters would be like being handed an LCD Soundsystem record and chucking it to listen to Hadouken!."

The album received a few positive reviews. Josh Holliday of Virgin Media gave the album a 10/10, and called it "an eclectic barrage of contrasting, and often cacophonously clashing genre combinations...it's this constant flittering and fidgeting between reality and surrealism, fact and fiction, British and Basque that propels Crystal Fighters into mythical realms". Stephen Jones of the British newspaper Metro also praised the album: "On paper, Crystal Fighters' self-produced 'fast dance music', melding Basque folk instruments and thumping electro punk pop with lyrics from singer Laure's grandfather's addled writings, sounds like a disaster. In reality it works." James Hull of The AU Review was "thrilled" with the limited edition album and "its smile inducing sounds."

On 8 August 2011, BBC 6 Music listed Star of Love as an Album of the Day.

Deluxe Edition

Following the Deluxe Edition's release, the Metro UK newspaper commented that "The five additional acoustic tracks emphasise [the band's] Latin roots, and the dreamy sentiments within the shouty fun, particularly on 'Champion Sound'."
However, Jen Long, of BBC Radio 1, wrote in the on-line music magazine The Line of Best Fit: "Well, as pretty as they are, it's just a bit pointless really. The original album is fine fun on its own."

Track listing

Personnel
In addition to Graham Dickson, Sebastian Pringle, and Gilbert Vierich, the following musicians and crew members were listed in the album's credits for the original release.
 Mimi Borrelli – vocals on all tracks except 1, 2, 4, 5 & 11
 Laure Stockley – vocals on all tracks except 1, 3, 4, 5 & 8
 Chris Hugall – drums on all track except 2, 4 & 8
 G. De Castro & A. Mcdowell – vocals on all tracks except 1, 4 & 7
 M Lozano & L. Youngman – vocals on track 6
 Charlie Hugall – additional recording on all tracks except 1, 2, 4 & 8; mixing on all tracks except 1, 2, 3, 4 & 8
 Adam Looker – additional recording on tracks 5 & 6; mixing on track 6

 Crystal Fighters – mixing on all tracks (tracks 2 and 8 mixed at the Crystal Ballroom)
 Alan O'Connell (Alalal) – mixing on tracks 1, 3 & 6
 Luke Smith – mixing on track 4
 Stuart Hawkes (of Metropolis Mastering) – mastering on all tracks
 John Stark – cover painting
 Tim Green – design & art direction

Charts

References

External links
 
 John Stark Gallery

2010 debut albums
Crystal Fighters albums